Erskine Hamilton Childers (11 December 1905 – 17 November 1974) was an Irish Fianna Fáil politician who served as the fourth president of Ireland from June 1973 to November 1974. He is the only Irish president to have died in office. He also served as Tánaiste and Minister for Health from 1969 to 1973, Minister for Transport and Power from 1959 to 1969, Minister for Posts and Telegraphs from 1951 to 1954 and 1966 to 1969, Minister for Lands from 1957 to 1959 and Parliamentary Secretary to the Minister for Local Government from 1944 to 1948. He served as a Teachta Dála (TD) from 1938 to 1973.

His father Robert Erskine Childers, a leading Irish republican and author of the espionage thriller The Riddle of the Sands, was executed during the Irish Civil War.

Early life
Childers was born in the Embankment Gardens, Westminster, London, to a Protestant family, originally from Glendalough, County Wicklow, Ireland. Although also born in England, his father, Robert Erskine Childers, had an Irish mother and had been raised by an uncle in County Wicklow, and after World War I took his family to live there. His mother, Molly Childers, was a Bostonian whose ancestors arrived on the Mayflower. Robert and Molly later emerged as prominent and outspoken Irish republican opponents of the political settlement with Britain which resulted in the establishment of the Irish Free State. 

Childers was educated at Gresham's School, Holt, hence his British upper-class accent. In 1922, when Childers was sixteen, his father was executed by the new Irish Free State on politically-inspired charges of gun-possession. The pistol he had been found with had been given to him by Michael Collins. Before his execution, in a spirit of reconciliation, the elder Childers obtained a promise from his son to seek out and shake the hand of every man who had signed his death warrant. 

After attending his father's funeral, Childers returned to Gresham's, then two years later he attended Trinity College, Cambridge where he studied History.

Career
After finishing his education, Childers worked for a period for a tourism board in Paris. In 1931, Éamon de Valera invited him to work for de Valera's recently founded newspaper The Irish Press in Dublin, where Childers became advertising manager. He became a naturalised Irish citizen in 1938. That same year, he was elected as a Fianna Fáil TD for the constituency of Athlone–Longford. He would remain a member of Dáil Éireann until 1973, when he resigned to become President of Ireland.

When former President of Ireland Douglas Hyde, who was a Protestant, died in 1949, most senior politicians did not attend the funeral service inside St. Patrick's Cathedral; rather, they remained outside. The exceptions were Noël Browne, the Minister for Health, and Childers, a fellow Protestant.

Childers joined the cabinet in 1951, as Minister for Posts and Telegraphs in the de Valera government. He then served as Minister for Lands in de Valera's 1957–59 cabinet. In 1959, the new Taoiseach Seán Lemass initially appointed him as Minister for Lands, before appointing him to the newly created position of Minister for Transport and Power. He served in that position until 1969, in combination with his former position of Minister for Posts and Telegraphs from 1966 under Jack Lynch. In 1969, he was appointed as Tánaiste and Minister for Health in 1969.

One commentator described his ministerial career as "spectacularly unsuccessful". Others praised his willingness to make tough decisions. He was outspoken in his opposition to Charles Haughey, in the aftermath of the Arms Crisis, when Haughey and Neil Blaney, having been both removed from the government, were sent for trial amid allegations of a plot to import arms for the Provisional IRA. (Both were acquitted.)

President of Ireland

Campaign
Fine Gael TD Tom O'Higgins had come within 11,000 votes (1%) of defeating de Valera in the 1966 presidential election; he was widely expected to win the 1973 election, when he was again the Fine Gael nominee. Childers was nominated by Fianna Fáil nominee at the behest of de Valera, who pressured Jack Lynch in the selection of the presidential candidate. He was a controversial nominee, owing not only to his British birth and upbringing but to his Protestantism. However, on the campaign trail his personal popularity proved enormous, and in a political upset, Childers was elected the fourth President of Ireland on 30 May 1973, defeating O'Higgins by 635,867 (52%) votes to 578,771 (48%).

Presidency
Childers was inaugurated as President of Ireland. He took the oath of office in the Irish language with some reluctance. His very distinctive Oxbridge accent made pronouncing Irish difficult, so it was written down on a large board for him phonetically to help him with this.

Childers, though 67, quickly gained a reputation as a vibrant, extremely hard-working President, and became highly popular and respected. However, he had a strained relationship with the incumbent government, led by Taoiseach Liam Cosgrave of Fine Gael. Childers had campaigned on a platform of making the presidency more open and hands-on, which Cosgrave viewed as a threat to his own agenda as head of government. He refused to co-operate with Childers's first priority upon taking office, the establishment of a think tank within Áras an Uachtaráin, to plan the country's future. Childers considered resigning from the presidency, but was convinced to remain by Cosgrave's Foreign Minister, Garret FitzGerald. However, Childers remained detached from the government; whereas previously, Presidents had been briefed by the Taoiseach once a month, Cosgrave briefed President Childers and his successor, Cearbhall Ó Dálaigh, on average once every six months.

Though frustrated about the lack of power he had in the office, Childers's daughter Nessa believes that he played an important behind-the-scenes role in easing the Northern Ireland conflict, reporting that former Prime Minister of Northern Ireland Terence O'Neill met secretly with her father at Áras an Uachtaráin on at least one occasion.

Death
Prevented from transforming the presidency as he desired, Childers instead threw his energy into a busy schedule of official visits and speeches, which was physically taxing.

On 17 November 1974, during a conference to the psychiatrists of the Royal College of Physicians in Dublin, Childers suffered sudden heart failure causing him to lie sideways and turn blue before suddenly collapsing. He was pronounced dead the same day at Mater Misericordiae University Hospital.

Childers's state funeral in St. Patrick's Cathedral, Dublin, was attended by his presidential predecessor Éamon de Valera and world leaders including the Earl Mountbatten of Burma (representing Queen Elizabeth II), the British Prime Minister Harold Wilson and British Opposition Leader Edward Heath, and heads of state from Europe and beyond. He was buried in the grounds of the Church of Ireland Derralossary Church, in Roundwood, County Wicklow.

Succession
Childers's widow, Rita Childers, shared her late husband's widespread personal popularity. Upon his death, when she issued a press statement pleading for the nation to keep the office above politics in choosing a successor, Cosgrave reacted by suggesting to the Opposition Leader, Jack Lynch, that they appoint Mrs. Childers to the presidency by acclamation. Lynch agreed four days after Childers's death to bring the suggestion to his party. However, when members of Cosgrave's Fine Gael disclosed the plan to the press on their own initiative, Lynch, believing his Fianna Fáil party was being denied a public voice in the decision, withdrew his support for her.

All parties instead agreed to nominate the former Attorney General and Chief Justice, Cearbhall Ó Dálaigh, as Childers's successor, who was elected unopposed.

Family
Childers married Ruth Ellen Dow in 1925. They had five children, Ruth Ellen Childers, born in July 1927, Erskine, born in March 1929, followed by Roderick Winthrop Childers in June 1931, and, in November 1937, twin daughters, Carainn and Margaret Osgood Childers. 

After the death of Dow in 1950, Childers married again, in 1952, to Rita Dudley, a Catholic. Together they had a daughter, Nessa, who is a former Member of the European Parliament and County Councillor. 

Childers was survived by children from both his marriages. His second wife Rita Dudley died on 9 May 2010.

See also
List of people on stamps of Ireland

References

External links
Headstone at Derralossary Church

1905 births
1974 deaths
Alumni of Trinity College, Cambridge
Erskine Hamilton
Fianna Fáil TDs
Irish Anglicans
Irish people of American descent
Irish people of English descent
Members of the 10th Dáil
Members of the 11th Dáil
Members of the 12th Dáil
Members of the 13th Dáil
Members of the 14th Dáil
Members of the 15th Dáil
Members of the 16th Dáil
Members of the 17th Dáil
Members of the 18th Dáil
Members of the 19th Dáil
Members of the 20th Dáil
Ministers for Health (Ireland)
Ministers for Transport (Ireland)
Parliamentary Secretaries of the 11th Dáil
Parliamentary Secretaries of the 12th Dáil
People educated at Gresham's School
Politicians from London
Presidents of Ireland
Protestant Irish nationalists
Tánaistí
The Irish Press people